Transmission Communications (or Trans:Com) is an independent record label based in Brisbane, Australia. The label focusses on production and performance of electronic music; including techno, industrial, synthpop, experimental, and all manner of crossovers.

During the 1990s, the label released a range of compilations for the Brisbane scene, including Evidence, Cyberia, and Abstraction, as well as releasing works from Pure Bunk, Low Key Operations, Sphere, Tycho Brahe, The Blood Party, All Electric Kitchen, and others. Additionally the label has curated showcases, including Cyberia (1995), 101 (2001), the Silhouette Series (2006), and Upgrade (2007).

In September 2014 the label published "BNE - The Definitive Archive: Brisbane Independent Electronic Music Production 1979-2014", which is a hardcover book and USB music archive that features 140 bands & artists, and 261 tracks. The launch event for BNE was held on 6 September 2014 at the Brisbane Powerhouse, and featured live performances from The Megamen, Vision Four 5, Soma Rasa, and Boxcar, supported by DJ Jen-E.

The label is now focussed on digital distribution and aggregation through iTunes and others, and is still involved in progressing Brisbane as one of Australia's key centres for alternative music production.

See also 
 List of record labels
 List of electronic music record labels

References

External links
 Transmission Communications' home page
 Label discography
 Label's Soundcloud page

Australian independent record labels
Electronic music record labels
Techno record labels
House music record labels
Synth-pop record labels
Industrial record labels
Indie pop record labels